The 2017 Women's Premier League Rugby season was the ninth season of the Women's Premier League in the United States. It began on September 2 and involved 10 teams.

Format 
For the first time, the WPL raised its numbers from eight teams to ten teams with Chicago North Shore Rugby and Beantown RFC joining the league. This was also the first year the Glendale Raptors changed their names to the Glendale Merlins due to the Glendale Raptors name being used by the newly formed Major League Rugby team. 

The ten teams were divided into two conferences, Red and Blue, comprising five teams. They each played eight conference games, one home and one away, with two bye weeks. The WPL season occurred in the fall, concurrently with the regular women's club season, with the National Championship being held in November 10–12.

For the Finals, teams were seeded based on the results of their conference during the regular season. The top four teams competed for the Cup and the bottom six teams for the Bowl.

Conference standings

Blue Conference

Red Conference

Matches

Week 1

Week 2

Week 3

Week 4

Week 5

Week 6

Week 7

Week 8

Week 9

Week 10

Playoffs

Bowl Semi-finals

Cup Semi-finals

Bowl Finals

9th place Final

7th place Final

5th place Finals

Cup Finals

3rd place Final

Grand Final

References

External links 

 USA Rugby Women's Premier League official site

Women's Premier League
Women's Premier League